Talbot and Branksome Woods is a ward in Dorset. Since 2019, the ward has elected 3 councillors to Bournemouth, Christchurch and Poole Council.

Geography 
The ward crosses the boundary of Bournemouth and Poole and covers the suburbs of Talbot Woods, Branksome Woods and Meyrick Park, and parts of Talbot Village and Charminster. The Talbot Campus of the Bournemouth University is also in the ward.

Elections

2019 Bournemouth, Christchurch and Poole Council election

References 

Wards of Bournemouth, Christchurch and Poole